Anthony Tuck (born 1940) is Emeritus Professor of Medieval History at the University of Bristol. He was educated at the Royal Grammar School, Newcastle (1948–59) and at the University of Cambridge. From 1965 to 1978 he was Senior Lecturer in Medieval History at Lancaster University. He was also Master of Collingwood College at the University of Durham from 1978 to 1985. His published work focus on the relationship between the king and nobility in late medieval England.

References

Select publications

External links 
Short biography on Blackwell Publishing.

1940 births
Living people
English historians
British medievalists
Academics of the University of Bristol
Alumni of the University of Cambridge
Academics of Lancaster University